Singing Between the Lines is a 2011 album by British Bhangra singer Jassi Sidhu and produced by Sidhu and longtime collaborators Aman Hayer and Rishi Rich along with four others:Honey Singh, Pama Sarai, Billy Sandher & PBN (Panajabi By Nature).

Track listing

Best Video
Best Video for connecting with Agg Vargi. And Thor Punjabhan Dhi

References

2011 albums
Jassi Sidhu albums